Bode Sowande (born 2 May 1948) is a Nigerian writer and dramatist, known for the theatric aesthetic of his plays about humanism and social change. He comes from a breed of writers in Nigeria that favors a post-traditional social and political landscape where the individual is the creator and maker of his own history not just the subject of norms and tradition. Sowande is a member of the so-called second generation of Nigerian playwrights, who favor a much more political tone in their writing and seek to promote an alliance or acquiescence to a change in the status quo and fate of the common man and farmers who constitute the majority of the Nigerian society. Some members of this groups includes: Zulu Sofola, Femi Osofisan and Festus Iyayi. Bode Sowande in May 2010, launched a tarot website Tarot With Prayers. 

He runs the drama group "Odu Themes", established in 1972, and the "Bode Sowande Theatre Academy", an internship programme for dramatists. 
He is married, with children.

Works

Novels and short stories
The Night Before Babylon, 1972  
A Farewell to Babylon and Other Plays,  1978
 Flamingo and other plays,   1980
 Without A Home, novel, 1982
 Our Man The President, novel, 1983
 The Missing Bridesmaid, novelette, 1984

Plays
 Tornadoes Full of Dreams, drama, 1990
 Arede Owo, [Yoruba adaptation of Molière's L'Avare], drama,1990.
 Ajantala-Pinocchio, drama, 1997
 Super Leaf, drama, 2004
Just For The Fun Of It [ An anecdotal history of Odu Themes Theatre],2008, memoirs.
 Long Story, drama [on last days of Abacha and M.K.O Abiola], 2010
 Mammy Water's  Wedding,  2014

E-book, The Spellbinder, stage drama on mental health challenge, and love stories of three billionaires.
 OkadaBooksApp.2021.
E-book, Snapshots, drama on  urban habitat with focus on slum dwellers, OkadaBooksApp, 2021.
 E-book, My WhatsApp Posts,
Social commentary in prose, from compiled WhatsApp posts of the author, OkadaBooks online. OkadaBooksApp.2022

Radio plays, broadcast on BBC African drama programmes; [1975-1996]
Bar Beach Prelude,
Get a Pigeon from Trafalgar Square,
Beggars Choice,
 A Dream from the sun,
Alarm on Lagoon Street,
Regina's Golden Goal.

Television
Odu Themes weekly Television programmes, Western Nigeria Television [ now NTA, Ibadan.]1973- 1978.
Television drama series, 'Acada Campus', NIGERIA TELEVISION AUTHORITY   [network ], 1981,1982.
Flamingo, 13 part television serial, Oyo State Broadcasting Service,1983
Without a Home, TV 13 episode serial, Oyo State Broadcasting Service, 1984
 TarotWithPrayers

Notes

New e-book  by Bode Sowande,
The Spellbinder, drama,OkadaBooksApp.

New e-book by Bode Sowande, Snapshots, drama, OkadaBooksApp.

References
 Osita Okagbue, African Writers Vol. 2 1997

Nigerian dramatists and playwrights
1948 births
Living people
Nigerian male novelists
20th-century Nigerian novelists
20th-century Nigerian dramatists and playwrights